Stephen Bruce Baylin is the deputy director and associate director for research at the Sidney Kimmel Comprehensive Cancer Center and Virginia and D.K. Ludwig Professor for Cancer Research and medicine and chief of cancer biology of the Johns Hopkins University School of Medicine. His research focus is epigenetics in the development of cancer, and he was one of the first researchers in this field in the 1980s.

Baylin received his BS and MD from Duke University in 1968. Baylin started his research against cancer during the Vietnam war. "They called us the Yellow Berets — MDs who opted to do their public service by engaging in research at the National Institutes of Health. I was interested in an inherited form of thyroid cancer, called medullary thyroid carcinoma."  He published his findings in relation to that research in the New England Journal of Medicine in 1970. He joined the faculty at Johns Hopkins in 1974. In 1991, he was appointed chief of tumor biology.

He and Peter Laird were the original investigators of the epigenetic portion of The Cancer Genome Atlas. He co-leads, with Peter Jones, a Stand Up To Cancer team science initiative in regulatory epigenetics, the VARI-SU2C Epigenetics Dream Team, and as part of this has an appointment to the faculty of the Van Andel Research Institute.

In 2010, he was featured in GQ's "Rock Stars of Science" to publicize biomedical researchers.

Awards 
 1990 – Edwin B. Astwood Award Lecture, Endocrine Society
 2004 – National Investigator of the Year Award, National Cancer Institute SPORE Program
 2005 – Simon M. Shubitz Cancer Prize and Lectureship
 2008 – David Workman Memorial Award, Samuel Waxman Cancer Research Foundation
 2008 – Raffaele Tecce Memorial Lecture, Rome
 2009 – Kirk A. Landon-AACR Prize for Basic Cancer Research
 2010 – Alfred G. Knudson Award for Excellence in Cancer Genetics, National Cancer Institute
 2010 – Nakahara Memorial Lecture, Princess Takematsu Symposium
 2011 – Medal of Honor, American Cancer Society
 2014 – SU2C Phillip A. Sharp Innovation in Collaboration Award
 2014 – Elected fellow of the AACR Academy

References 

Year of birth missing (living people)
Living people
American oncologists
Fellows of the AACR Academy
Duke University School of Medicine alumni
Johns Hopkins University faculty